Llandudno railway station serves the seaside town of Llandudno in North Wales, and is the terminus of a  long branch line from  on the Crewe to Holyhead North Wales Coast Line. The station is managed by Transport for Wales Rail, who operate all trains serving it.

Llandudno Victoria station, the lower terminus of the Great Orme Tramway, is a 15-minute walk from the main station.

History

The first station and the branch line was constructed by the St. George's Harbour and Railway Company and opened on 1 October 1858. The trains at first ran to and from Conwy station until the completion of Llandudno Junction station. The line  was soon absorbed by the London and North Western Railway, which in turn became part of the London, Midland and Scottish Railway in 1923. Vaughan Street in Llandudno was also laid out in 1858 as the station approach road.

As the first station had become inadequate to cope with increasing usage, the present Llandudno station buildings and frontage, together with five platforms and an extensive glass roof, were erected in 1892 and the station still has the Victorian carriage road between the two principal platforms. Platforms 4 & 5 had been disused since 1978 with the tracks to the platforms being disconnected and eventually dismantled in 2012. The southernmost half of the glass roof was removed some decades ago, and the remainder was substantially cut back again in 1990. Half of the station frontage (including the former waiting and refreshment rooms) that had been disused for years was demolished in May 2009. The station retains its semaphore signalling and manual signal box.

Facilities

In the 2000s, plans were unveiled for the transformation of the station into a Transport Interchange, which would involve the demolition of the disused part of the frontage and the introduction of new passenger facilities. Following the provision of funding, reconstruction began in 2013 and the £5.2 million scheme was completed in the summer of 2014. The work included a 130-space car park (on the site of the former Platforms 4 & 5), a glazed concourse, a bus interchange, new taxi rank, and a shop/cafe. There are also a new entrance and improvements to the platforms.

The ticket office is staffed on a part-time basis. A self-service ticket machine is also provided for use and for collecting advance purchase tickets. There are also toilets and a waiting room on the concourse. Train running information is provided by digital information screens, posters and automated announcements. Step-free access is available to all platforms.

Services

Transport for Wales Rail provides an hourly service to Manchester Piccadilly via Colwyn Bay, Rhyl, Prestatyn, Flint, Chester and Warrington.
Transport for Wales Rail also operates an hourly shuttle (with some afternoon gaps) to Llandudno Junction which connects with services to Bangor & Holyhead and for services to Birmingham New Street, London and South Wales. They also operate one weekday direct service from Llandudno to  via  without any change being required at Llandudno Junction (and one the other way, plus two more from Birmingham International).
Transport for Wales Rail provides four trains per day along the Conwy Valley Line serving Llanrwst, Betws-y-Coed and Blaenau Ffestiniog.
On Sundays, TfW Rail operate a (roughly) half-hourly shuttle service to Llandudno Junction until mid-evening (plus a single later trip) - this formerly operated only in the summer months (May to September) prior to the winter 2019 timetable change, but now runs throughout the year. In addition, three trains a day run down the Conwy Valley Line to Blaenau Ffestiniog.
Virgin Trains West Coast used to run a direct afternoon service to London Euston, but this service was discontinued at the December 2008 timetable change - it instead now terminates at Chester. However, from December 2022 Avanti West Coast will reintroduce this service but only in the summer months.

Notes

Further reading

External links

  Llandudno and North Wales Train Services 1947 and 2003
  Virgin Trains restore through London to Llandudno Service

Railway stations in Conwy County Borough
DfT Category E stations
Former London and North Western Railway stations
Railway stations in Great Britain opened in 1858
Railway stations served by Transport for Wales Rail
Railway station